The 1994–95 New York Knicks season was the 49th season for the Knicks in the National Basketball Association (NBA). The Knicks entered the season as runner-ups of the 1994 NBA Finals, where they lost to the Houston Rockets in seven games. During the off-season, the Knicks acquired Doug Christie from the Los Angeles Lakers. However, Christie would play only just twelve games, because of an ankle injury. Early into the season, the team released Doc Rivers, who later signed as a free agent with the San Antonio Spurs. The Knicks had a 12–12 start to the season, but then won 17 of their next 19 games, held a 30–16 record at the All-Star break, and posted a 55–27 record in the Atlantic Division. They finished in second place, two games behind the top-seeded Orlando Magic. By earning the #3 seed in the Eastern Conference, the Knicks qualified for the NBA Playoffs for the eighth consecutive season.

Patrick Ewing averaged 23.9 points, 11.0 rebounds and 2.0 blocks per game, finished in fourth place in Most Valuable Player voting, and was selected for the 1995 NBA All-Star Game, while John Starks averaged 15.3 points and 5.1 assists per game, and led the league with 217 three-point field goals, becoming the first player ever to reach up to 200 three-pointers in a single season. In addition, Charles D. Smith provided the team with 12.7 points and 1.3 blocks per game, while Derek Harper averaged 11.5 points and 5.7 assists per game, and sixth man Anthony Mason averaged 9.9 points and 8.4 rebounds per game off the bench, and was named Sixth Man of the Year. Charles Oakley only played just 50 games this season due to a toe injury, averaging 10.1 points and 8.9 rebounds per game, and three-point specialist Hubert Davis contributed 10.0 points per game off the bench.

In the Eastern Conference First Round of the 1995 NBA Playoffs, the Knicks defeated the 6th–seeded Cleveland Cavaliers three games to one, advancing to the Eastern Conference Semi-finals. The Knicks lost Game 1 of their series to the 2nd–seeded Indiana Pacers, as Reggie Miller scored eight points in the final 18.7 seconds to bring the Pacers back from a six-point deficit. The Pacers gained a 3–1 series edge, before the Knicks won two straight games to force a seventh game at Madison Square Garden. With the Knicks down by two points in the final seconds, Ewing had a chance to send the game to overtime, but missed his driving layup attempt, as the Pacers advanced to the Eastern Conference Finals.

Following the season, Pat Riley quit as head coach to take over the coaching job with the Miami Heat, while Greg Anthony left in the 1995 NBA Expansion Draft, and Anthony Bonner was released to free agency.

NBA Draft

Roster

Season standings

Division

Conference

Notes
z – Clinched home court advantage for the entire playoffs
c – Clinched home court advantage for the conference playoffs
y – Clinched division title
x – Clinched playoff spot

Record vs. opponents

Game log

Regular season

|- style="background:#cfc;"
| 1 
| November 4
| @ Boston
| W 120–107
| Charles Smith (23)
| Patrick Ewing (13)
| Derek Harper (11)
| Boston Garden14,890
| 1–0
|- style="background:#cfc;"
| 2 
| November 8
| L.A. Lakers
| W 117–113
| Patrick Ewing (24)
| Charles Oakley (12)
| Derek Harper (8)
| Madison Square Garden19,763
| 2–0
|- style="background:#cfc;"
| 3
| November 10
| Orlando
| W 101–99
| Patrick Ewing (24)
| Charles Smith (13)
| Derek Harper (9)
| Madison Square Garden19,763
| 3–0
|- style="background:#fcc;"
| 4 
| November 12
| @ San Antonio
| L 82–101
| Patrick Ewing (22)
| Charles Oakley (10)
| Greg Anthony (5)
| Alamodome19,710
| 3–1
|- style="background:#fcc;"
| 5
| November 14
| @ Utah
| L 97–110
| John Starks (35)
| Patrick Ewing (7)
| John Starks (8)
| Delta Center18,955
| 3–2
|- style="background:#cfc;"
| 6
| November 16
| @ L.A. Lakers
| W 110–89
| Hubert Davis (27)
| Ewing, Oakley (8)
| Mason, Anthony (7)
| Great Western Forum13,630
| 4–2
|- style="background:#fcc;"
| 7 
| November 17
| @ Golden State
| L 100–109
| Derek Harper (21)
| Charles Oakley (14)
| Derek Harper (7)
| Oakland-Alameda County Coliseum Arena15,025
| 4–3
|- style="background:#cfc;"
| 8
| November 19
| Atlanta
| W 92–79
| Charles Smith (24)
| Charles Oakley (15)
| three players tied (5)
| Madison Square Garden19,763
| 5–3
|- style="background:#cfc;"
| 9
| November 21
| San Antonio
| W 92–88
| Charles Oakley (16)
| Oakley, Ewing (7)
| three players tied (5)
| Madison Square Garden19,763
| 6–3
|- style="background:#fcc;"
| 10
| November 26
| Charlotte
| L 82–101
| Patrick Ewing (22)
| Ewing, Oakley (14)
| John Starks (7)
| Madison Square Garden19,763
| 6–4
|- style="background:#cfc;"
| 11
| November 29
| @ Washington
| W 99–91
| Patrick Ewing (20)
| Patrick Ewing (15)
| Derek Harper (6)
| US Airways Arena18,756
| 7–4

|- style="background:#fcc;"
| 12
| December 2
| @ Orlando
| L 100–125
| Patrick Ewing (15)
| Charles Oakley (11)
| John Starks (7)
| Orlando Arena16,010
| 7–5
|- style="background:#cfc;"
| 13
| December 3
| Washington
| W 111–95
| Charles Smith (23)
| Patrick Ewing (10)
| Greg Anthony (8)
| Madison Square Garden19,763
| 8–5
|- style="background:#cfc;"
| 14
| December 5
| @ Philadelphia
| W 101–96 (OT)
| Patrick Ewing (25)
| Charles Oakley (15)
| Harper, Ewing (6)
| CoreStates Spectrum14,212
| 9–5
|- style="background:#cfc;"
| 15
| December 6
| Boston
| W 104–90
| Charles Smith (20)
| Oakley, Mason (12)
| Greg Anthony (10)
| Madison Square Garden19,763
| 10–5
|- style="background:#fcc;"
| 16
| December 9
| @ Atlanta
| L 85–89
| Ewing, Smith (20)
| Charles Oakley (15)
| John Starks (6)
| The Omni14,967
| 10–6
|- style="background:#cfc;"
| 17
| December 10
| Philadelphia
| W 107–103
| Patrick Ewing (28)
| Charles Oakley (16)
| Derek Harper (9)
| Madison Square Garden19,763
| 11–6
|- style="background:#fcc;"
| 18
| December 12
| Miami
| L 111–122
| Patrick Ewing (30)
| Charles Oakley (12)
| John Starks (7)
| Madison Square Garden19,763
| 11–7
|- style="background:#cfc;"
| 19
| December 15
| @ Sacramento
| W 94–84
| Patrick Ewing (27)
| Patrick Ewing (18)
| John Starks (9)
| ARCO Arena17,317
| 12–7
|- style="background:#fcc;"
| 20
| December 16
| @ Phoenix
| L 85–106
| Patrick Ewing (15)
| Patrick Ewing (12)
| Derek Harper (6)
| America West Arena19,023
| 12–8
|- style="background:#fcc;"
| 21
| December 18
| @ Portland
| L 87–111
| Patrick Ewing (24)
| Patrick Ewing (14)
| Derek Harper (6)
| Memorial Coliseum12,888
| 12–9
|- style="background:#fcc;"
| 22
| December 20
| New Jersey
| L 83–85
| Patrick Ewing (22)
| Patrick Ewing (11)
| Hubert Davis (4)
| Madison Square Garden19,763
| 12–10
|- style="background:#fcc;"
| 23
| December 22
| Cleveland
| L 90–93
| Charles Oakley (19)
| Charles Oakley (13)
| Derek Harper (6)
| Madison Square Garden19,763
| 12–11
|- style="background:#fcc;"
| 24
| December 25
| @ Chicago
| L 104–107 (OT)
| Patrick Ewing (30)
| Patrick Ewing (13)
| three players tied (6)
| United Center22,854
| 12–12
|- style="background:#cfc;"
| 25
| December 27
| @ New Jersey
| W 99–91
| John Starks (22)
| Ewing, Mason (8)
| Ewing, M. Williams (5)
| Brendan Byrne Arena20,049
| 13–12
|- style="background:#cfc;"
| 26
| December 28
| Detroit
| W 101–93
| Patrick Ewing (30)
| Anthony Mason (14)
| John Starks (8)
| Madison Square Garden19,763
| 14–12
|- style="background:#cfc;"
| 27
| December 30
| @ Minnesota
| W 90–81
| Patrick Ewing (30)
| Patrick Ewing (12)
| Harper, Starks (7)
| Target Center18,122
| 15–12

|- style="background:#cfc;"
| 28
| January 4
| Atlanta
| W 89–80
| Patrick Ewing (21)
| Patrick Ewing (12)
| Ewing, Harper (4)
| Madison Square Garden19,763
| 16–12
|- style="background:#cfc;"
| 29
| January 6
| @ Cleveland
| W 103–93
| John Starks (23)
| Patrick Ewing (11)
| Derek Harper (7)
| Gund Arena20,562
| 17–12
|- style="background:#cfc;"
| 30
| January 8
| Minnesota
| W 102–87
| Ewing, Davis (22)
| Ewing, Mason (9)
| Derek Harper (8)
| Madison Square Garden19,763
| 18–12
|- style="background:#cfc;"
| 31
| January 10
| Indiana
| W 117–105
| John Starks (22)
| Patrick Ewing (9)
| Derek Harper (13)
| Madison Square Garden19,763
| 19–12
|- style="background:#cfc;"
| 32
| January 13
| @ Milwaukee
| W 91–88
| Patrick Ewing (24)
| Patrick Ewing (14)
| Derek Harper (7)
| Bradley Center17,909
| 20–12
|- style="background:#fcc;"
| 33
| January 14
| Utah
| L 81–86
| John Starks (22)
| Patrick Ewing (14)
| Derek Harper (6)
| Madison Square Garden19,763
| 20–13
|- style="background:#cfc;"
| 34
| January 16
| New Jersey
| W 107–90
| Patrick Ewing (32)
| Patrick Ewing (15)
| John Starks (9)
| Madison Square Garden19,763
| 21–13
|- style="background:#cfc;"
| 35
| January 19, 19958:00p.m. EST
| @ Houston
| W 93–77
| Starks (22)
| Ewing (18)
| Starks (7)
| The Summit16,611
| 22–13
|- style="background:#cfc;"
| 36
| January 20
| @ Dallas
| W 106–93
| Patrick Ewing (36)
| Patrick Ewing (12)
| Derek Harper (11)
| Reunion Arena17,502
| 23–13
|- style="background:#cfc;"
| 37
| January 22
| @ Miami
| W 104–95
| John Starks (26)
| Patrick Ewing (15)
| Derek Harper (9)
| Miami Arena15,200
| 24–13
|- style="background:#cfc;"
| 38
| January 24
| Portland
| W 105–99
| John Starks (26)
| Anthony Mason (15)
| Mason, Ewing (5)
| Madison Square Garden19,763
| 25–13
|- style="background:#cfc;"
| 39
| January 26
| L.A. Clippers
| W 87–74
| Patrick Ewing (21)
| Anthony Mason (13)
| Derek Harper (5)
| Madison Square Garden19,763
| 26–13
|- style="background:#fcc;"
| 40
| January 27
| @ Charlotte
| L 90–105
| John Starks (26)
| Anthony Mason (11)
| Derek Harper (6)
| Charlotte Coliseum23,698
| 26–14
|- style="background:#cfc;"
| 41
| January 29
| Phoenix
| W 107–88
| Patrick Ewing (35)
| Anthony Mason (19)
| John Starks (9)
| Madison Square Garden19,763
| 27–14
|- style="background:#cfc;"
| 42
| January 31
| Golden State
| W 90–87
| Derek Harper (26)
| Patrick Ewing (14)
| John Starks (8)
| Madison Square Garden19,763
| 28–14

|- style="background:#cfc;"
| 43
| February 3
| @ Philadelphia
| W 106–86
| Patrick Ewing (30)
| Patrick Ewing (15)
| Derek Harper (7)
| CoreStates Spectrum18,168
| 29–14
|- style="background:#fcc;"
| 44
| February 5
| @ Orlando
| L 100–103 (OT)
| Patrick Ewing (38)
| Patrick Ewing (13)
| Harper, Starks (7)
| Orlando Arena16,010
| 29–15
|- style="background:#fcc;"
| 45
| February 7
| Milwaukee
| L 87–95
| Ewing, Starks (23)
| Patrick Ewing (17)
| Derek Harper (7)
| Madison Square Garden19,763
| 29–16
|- style="background:#cfc;"
| 46
| February 8
| @ Indiana
| W 96–77
| Ewing, Starks (24)
| Patrick Ewing (22)
| Derek Harper (6)
| Market Square Arena16,677
| 30–16
|- style="text-align:center;"
| colspan="9" style="background:#bbcaff;"|All-Star Break
|- style="background:#fcc;"
| 47
| February 14
| @ Detroit
| L 94–106
| Patrick Ewing (24)
| Patrick Ewing (15)
| John Starks (7)
| The Palace of Auburn Hills15,513
| 30–17
|- style="background:#cfc;"
| 48
| February 16
| @ Miami
| W 96–87
| Ewing, Mason (22)
| Anthony Mason (14)
| Mason, Starks (5)
| Miami Arena15,200
| 31–17
|- style="background:#cfc;"
| 49
| February 17
| Miami
| W 100–91
| Hubert Davis (21)
| Anthony Mason (11)
| Harper, Anthony (5)
| Madison Square Garden19,763
| 32–17
|- style="background:#cfc;"
| 50
| February 19, 19951:00p.m. EST
| Houston
| W 122–117
| Ewing (31)
| Mason (10)
| Harper (9)
| Madison Square Garden19,763
| 33–17
|- style="background:#fcc;"
| 51
| February 21
| Cleveland
| L 91–99
| Patrick Ewing (35)
| Patrick Ewing (9)
| Starks, Harper (7)
| Madison Square Garden19,763
| 33–18
|- style="background:#cfc;"
| 52
| February 23
| Sacramento
| W 103–90
| Patrick Ewing (38)
| Anthony Mason (12)
| Derek Harper (9)
| Madison Square Garden19,763
| 34–18
|- style="background:#cfc;"
| 53
| February 26
| Philadelphia
| W 104–99
| Patrick Ewing (32)
| Patrick Ewing (18)
| Derek Harper (6)
| Madison Square Garden19,763
| 35–18
|- style="background:#fcc;"
| 54
| February 28
| @ Orlando
| L 106–118
| Patrick Ewing (32)
| Patrick Ewing (15)
| Starks, Harper (6)
| Orlando Arena16,010
| 35–19

|- style="background:#cfc;"
| 55
| March 2
| Chicago
| W 93–89
| Anthony Mason (26)
| Anthony Mason (12)
| Anthony Mason (7)
| Madison Square Garden19,763
| 36–19
|- style="background:#cfc;"
| 56
| March 4
| @ Cleveland
| W 89–76
| John Starks (29)
| Anthony Mason (14)
| Starks, Harper (6)
| Gund Arena20,562
| 37–19
|- style="background:#cfc;"
| 57
| March 7
| Boston
| W 115–110
| Patrick Ewing (46)
| Patrick Ewing (12)
| Derek Harper (10)
| Madison Square Garden19,763
| 38–19
|- style="background:#cfc;"
| 58
| March 8
| @ Boston
| W 108–100
| Hubert Davis (22)
| Anthony Mason (12)
| Anthony Mason (7)
| Boston Garden14,890
| 39–19
|- style="background:#fcc;"
| 59
| March 10
| @ Atlanta
| L 81–108
| John Starks (17)
| Patrick Ewing (10)
| John Starks (5)
| Omni Coliseum14,596
| 39–20
|- style="background:#fcc;"
| 60
| March 11
| Seattle
| L 84–96
| Patrick Ewing (34)
| Ewing, Oakley (10)
| John Starks (8)
| Madison Square Garden19,763
| 39–21
|- style="background:#cfc;"
| 61
| March 14
| Denver
| W 94–74
| Patrick Ewing (21)
| Charles Oakley (17)
| Derek Harper (5)
| Madison Square Garden19,763
| 40–21
|- style="background:#cfc;"
| 62
| March 17
| @ Washington
| W 89–81
| Patrick Ewing (36)
| Charles Oakley (11)
| John Starks (8)
| US Airways Arena18,756
| 41–21
|- style="background:#cfc;"
| 63
| March 18
| New Jersey
| W 92–91 (OT)
| John Starks (25)
| Patrick Ewing (14)
| Derek Harper (7)
| Madison Square Garden19,763
| 42–21
|- style="background:#fcc;"
| 64
| March 21
| Charlotte
| L 69–78
| Patrick Ewing (35)
| Patrick Ewing (18)
| Derek Harper (9)
| Madison Square Garden19,763
| 42–22
|- style="background:#cfc;"
| 65
| March 23
| @ Denver
| W 104–101
| Patrick Ewing (22)
| Ewing, Smith (8)
| John Starks (9)
| McNichols Sports Arena17,171
| 43–22
|- style="background:#cfc;"
| 66
| March 25
| @ L.A. Clippers
| W 94–86
| Patrick Ewing (27)
| Patrick Ewing (8)
| Derek Harper (6)
| Los Angeles Memorial Sports Arena16,021
| 44–22
|- style="background:#fcc;"
| 67
| March 26
| @ Seattle
| L 93–82
| Patrick Ewing (27)
| Anthony Mason (10)
| John Starks (5)
| Tacoma Dome18,056
| 44–23
|- style="background:#fcc;"
| 68
| March 28
| Chicago
| L 111–113
| Patrick Ewing (36)
| Charles Oakley (8)
| Derek Harper (7)
| Madison Square Garden19,763
| 44–24
|- style="background:#cfc;"
| 69
| March 29
| @ Detroit
| W 107–97
| Patrick Ewing (28)
| Charles Oakley (9)
| Derek Harper (7)
| The Palace of Auburn Hills17,067
| 45–24
|- style="background:#cfc;"
| 70
| March 31
| Dallas
| W 101–90
| Patrick Ewing (18)
| Anthony Bonner (9)
| Harper, Anthony (6)
| Madison Square Garden19,763
| 46–24

|- style="background:#cfc;"
| 71
| April 2
| @ New Jersey
| W 94–85
| John Starks (26)
| Charles Oakley (12)
| Anthony Mason (6)
| Brendan Byrne Arena20,049
| 47–24
|- style="background:#fcc;"
| 72
| April 4
| Indiana
| L 90–94
| Patrick Ewing (28)
| Anthony Mason (14)
| Derek Harper (12)
| Madison Square Garden19,763
| 47–25
|- style="background:#cfc;"
| 73
| April 5
| @ Milwaukee
| W 114–94
| Patrick Ewing (34)
| Patrick Ewing (18)
| John Starks (6)
| Bradley Center14,679
| 48–25
|- style="background:#cfc;"
| 74
| April 8
| Detroit
| W 113–96
| Patrick Ewing (19)
| Anthony Mason (9)
| John Starks (8)
| Madison Square Garden19,763
| 49–25
|- style="background:#cfc;"
| 75
| April 11
| Miami
| W 112–99
| Patrick Ewing (31)
| Ewing, Mason (12)
| John Starks (9)
| Madison Square Garden19,763
| 50–25
|- style="background:#cfc;"
| 76
| April 13
| Washington
| W 110–100
| Patrick Ewing (25)
| Patrick Ewing (8)
| Greg Anthony (7)
| Madison Square Garden19,763
| 51–25
|- style="background:#cfc;"
| 77
| April 14
| @ Indiana
| W 88–84
| Patrick Ewing (30)
| Patrick Ewing (12)
| John Starks (7)
| Market Square Arena16,702
| 52–25
|- style="background:#fcc;"
| 78
| April 16
| @ Chicago
| L 90–111
| Charles Smith (22)
| Anthony Mason (13)
| Derek Harper (4)
| United Center23,889
| 52–26
|- style="background:#fcc;"
| 79
| April 17
| Milwaukee
| L 93–99
| Anthony Mason (17)
| Patrick Ewing (13)
| Anthony Mason (7)
| Madison Square Garden19,763
| 52–27
|- style="background:#cfc;"
| 80
| April 20
| @ Charlotte
| W 91–86
| John Starks (18)
| Anthony Mason (9)
| John Starks (7)
| Charlotte Coliseum23,698
| 53–27
|- style="background:#cfc;"
| 81
| April 21
| @ Boston
| W 99–92
| Hubert Davis (20)
| Charles Oakley (16)
| Greg Anthony (8)
| Boston Garden14,890
| 54–27
|- style="background:#cfc;"
| 82
| April 23
| Orlando
| W 113–99
| Charles Smith (29)
| Anthony Mason (12)
| Mason, Anthony (6)
| Madison Square Garden19,763
| 55–27

Playoffs

|- style="background:#cfc;"
| 1 
| April 27
| Cleveland
| W 103–79
| Patrick Ewing (21)
| Charles Oakley (11)
| John Starks (7)
| Madison Square Garden19,763
| 1–0
|- style="background:#fcc;"
| 2 
| April 29
| Cleveland
| L 84–90
| Ewing, Starks (21)
| Patrick Ewing (12)
| Charles Oakley (5)
| Madison Square Garden19,763
| 1–1
|- style="background:#cfc;"
| 3
| May 1
| @ Cleveland
| W 83–81
| Patrick Ewing (23)
| Patrick Ewing (10)
| Derek Harper (5)
| Gund Arena19,352
| 2–1
|- style="background:#cfc;"
| 4
| May 4
| @ Cleveland
| W 93–80
| Derek Harper (30)
| Patrick Ewing (13)
| Charles Oakley (8)
| Gund Arena18,575
| 3–1

|- style="background:#fcc;"
| 1
| May 7
| Indiana
| L 105–107
| John Starks (21)
| Oakley, Ewing (10)
| John Starks (7)
| Madison Square Garden19,763
| 0–1
|- style="background:#cfc;"
| 2
| May 9
| Indiana
| W 96–77
| Derek Harper (24)
| Anthony Mason (8)
| Derek Harper (8)
| Madison Square Garden19,763
| 1–1
|- style="background:#fcc;"
| 3
| May 11
| @ Indiana
| L 95–97
| Oakley, Starks (23)
| Charles Oakley (7)
| John Starks (9)
| Market Square Arena16,675
| 1–2
|- style="background:#fcc;"
| 4
| May 13
| @ Indiana
| L 84–98
| Patrick Ewing (25)
| Charles Oakley (10)
| Derek Harper (10)
| Market Square Arena16,678
| 1–3
|- style="background:#cfc;"
| 5
| May 17
| Indiana
| W 96–95
| Patrick Ewing (19)
| Charles Oakley (13)
| John Starks (7)
| Madison Square Garden19,763
| 2–3
|- style="background:#cfc;"
| 6
| May 19
| @ Indiana
| W 92–82
| Patrick Ewing (25)
| Patrick Ewing (15)
| Derek Harper (7)
| Market Square Arena16,679
| 3–3
|- style="background:#fcc;"
| 7
| May 21
| Indiana
| L 95–97
| Patrick Ewing (29)
| Patrick Ewing (14)
| Harper, Oakley (6)
| Madison Square Garden19,763
| 3–4

Awards and honors
Patrick Ewing was named Player of the Week for games played January 15 through January 22.
Patrick Ewing was named Player of the Month for January.
Patrick Ewing was selected as a reserve for the Eastern Conference in the All-Star Game. It was his ninth All-Star selection.
Anthony Mason received the NBA Sixth Man of the Year Award.
John Starks led the league in three-point field goals with 217.
John Starks led the league in three-point field goal attempts with 611.

Player stats

Regular season

Playoffs

Source:

Transactions
The Knicks were involved in the following transactions during the 1994–95 season.

Trades

Free agents

Additions

Subtractions

Source:

Notes

References

External links
1994–95 New York Knicks Statistics

New York Knicks seasons
New York Knicks
New York Knicks
New York Knick
1990s in Manhattan
Madison Square Garden